"" is a French folk song of the 18th century. Its composer and lyricist are unknown. Its simple melody is commonly taught to beginners learning an instrument.

Lyrics

The song appears as early as 1820 in Le Voiture Verseés, with only the first verse. Four verses were later re-published in the 1858 compilation Chants et Chansons populaires de la France.

In the 1870 compilation Chansons et Rondes Enfantines, only the first two verses of the original four were retained.

Some sources report that "plume" (pen) was originally "lume" (an old word for "light" or "lamp"). Much of the lyrics has sexual innuendos.

In music

19th-century French composer Camille Saint-Saëns quoted the first few notes of the tune in the section "The Fossils", part of his suite The Carnival of the Animals.

French composer Ferdinand Hérold wrote a set of variations for piano solo in E-flat major.

Claude Debussy, composer of the similarly named "Clair de lune" from his Suite bergamasque, uses "Au clair de la lune" as the basis of his song "Pierrot" (Pantomime, L. 31) from Quatre Chansons de Jeunesse.

Erik Satie quoted this song in the section "Le flirt" (No. 19) of his 1914 piano collection Sports et divertissements.

In 1926, Samuel Barber rewrote "H-35: Au Claire de la Lune: A Modern Setting of an old folk tune" while studying at the Curtis Institute of Music.

In 1928, Marc Blitzstein orchestrated "Variations sur 'Au Claire de la Lune'."

In 1964, French pop singer France Gall recorded a version of this song, with altered lyrics to make it a love song.

In 2008, a phonautograph paper recording made by Édouard-Léon Scott de Martinville of "Au clair de la lune" on 9 April 1860, was digitally converted to sound by researchers at the Lawrence Berkeley National Laboratory. This one-line excerpt of the song is the earliest recognizable record of the human voice and the earliest recognizable record of music. According to those researchers, the phonautograph recording contains the beginning of the song, "".

In 2008, composer Fred Momotenko composed an eponymous tribute score for 4-part vocal ensemble and surround audio.

In visual art
In the 1804 painting and sculpting exposition, Pierre-Auguste Vafflard presented a painting depicting Edward Young burying his daughter by night. An anonymous critic commented on the monochromatic nature of that painting with the lyrics:

In literature
The "Story of my Friend Peterkin and the Moon" in The Ladies Pocket Magazine (1835) mentions the song several times and ends:
Indeed, what must have been the chagrin and despair of this same Jaurat, when he heard sung every night by all the little boys of Paris, that song of "Au clair de la lune", every verse of which was a remembrance of happiness to Cresson, and a reproach of cruelty to friend Peterkin, who would not open his door to his neighbor, when he requested this slight service.

In his 1952 memoir Witness, Whittaker Chambers reminisced:
In my earliest recollections of her, my mother is sitting in the lamplight, in a Windsor rocking chair, in front of the parlor stove. She is holding my brother on her lap. It is bed time and, in a thin sweet voice, she is singing him into drowsiness. I am on the floor, as usual among the chair legs, and I crawl behind my mother's chair because I do not like the song she is singing and do not want her to see what it does to me. She sings: "Au clair de la lune; Mon ami, Pierrot; Prête-moi ta plume; Pour écrire un mot."

Then the vowels darken ominously. My mother's voice deepens dramatically, as if she were singing in a theater. This was the part of the song I disliked most, not only because I knew that it was sad, but because my mother was deliberately (and rather unfairly, I thought) making it sadder: "Ma chandelle est morte; Je n'ai plus de feu; Ouvre-moi la porte; Pour l'amour de Dieu."

I knew, from an earlier explanation, that the song was about somebody (a little girl, I thought) who was cold because her candle and fire had gone out. She went to somebody else (a little boy, I thought) and asked him to help her for God's sake. He said no. It seemed a perfectly pointless cruelty to me.

In their 1957 play Bad Seed: A Play in Two Acts, Maxwell Anderson and William March write: "A few days later, in the same apartment. The living-room is empty: Rhoda can be seen practicing 'Au Clair de la Lune' on the piano in the den."
In F. Scott Fitzgerald's novel Tender is the Night, Dick and Nicole Diver's children sing the first verse at the request of the film producer Earl Brady.

References

External links

 Listen 1931 recording by Yvonne Printemps.

French children's songs
French folk songs
Traditional children's songs
French-language songs
Lullabies
Songs about the Moon
Fiction set on the Moon
Songwriter unknown
18th-century songs
Year of song unknown